Martina Borg (born 24 October 1996) is a Maltese football midfielder playing for Hibernians F.C.

See also
List of Malta women's international footballers

External links 
 

1996 births
Living people
Maltese women's footballers
Malta women's international footballers
Women's association football midfielders
Malta women's youth international footballers
Roma Calcio Femminile players
Torres Calcio Femminile players
Maltese expatriate footballers
Maltese expatriate sportspeople in Italy
Expatriate women's footballers in Italy